Nama depressum, commonly known as depressed fiddleleaf, is a species of flowering plant in the borage family. It is native to Nevada and eastern California, where it grows in dry desert and mountain habitat, including the Mojave Desert.

Description
Nama depressum is a hairy annual plant forming a small patch of prostrate stems up to 10 centimeters long. The widely lance-shaped or spoon-shaped leaves are under 2 centimeters in length, and occur mostly at the distal half of the stem, leaving the stem bases bare. The tiny flower is white or pink, funnel-shaped, and just a few millimeters wide.

External links
Jepson Manual Treatment - Nama depressum
Nama depressum - Photo gallery

depressum
Flora of the California desert regions
Flora of the Great Basin
Flora of Nevada
Flora without expected TNC conservation status